Newcastle is a census-designated place (CDP) comprising the main village of the town of Newcastle in Lincoln County, Maine, United States. The population was 667 at the 2010 census, out of 1,752 in the entire town. In the 2000 census, the village was part of the Damariscotta-Newcastle CDP.

Geography
The Newcastle CDP is in the eastern part of the town of Newcastle in central Lincoln County. The CDP is on the west bank of the Damariscotta River, which forms the boundary with the town of Damariscotta. The CDP extends south down the river to a location north of Little Point, and north upriver and along Salt Bay to Damariscotta Mills and the outlet of Damariscotta Lake. Starting at its southern point on the Damariscotta River, the western boundary of the CDP follows Schrafft Road, River Road, an unnamed stream, a powerline, Old County Road, Kavanagh Road, Academy Road and Pond Road (Maine State Route 215) to Damariscotta Lake.

US Route 1 passes through the community, leading northeast  to Rockland and southwest  to Bath. U.S. Route 1 Business splits off US 1 to run through the centers of Newcastle and Damariscotta as Main Street. Maine Route 215 has its southern terminus at US 1 Business in Newcastle and leads north  to ME 32 in the northern part of the town of Jefferson.

Demographics

References

External links
 Town of Newcastle

Census-designated places in Maine
Census-designated places in Lincoln County, Maine